Sepharvaim was a city mentioned in the Bible as being captured by the Assyrians. It was taken by a king of Assyria, probably Sargon II, (cited in the Old Testament in 2 Kings 17:24, 31; 18:34; 19:13; Book of Isaiah 37:13). It was a double city, and received the common name Sepharvaim, i.e., "the two Sipparas," or "the two booktowns."

The Sippara on the east bank of the Euphrates is now called Abu-Habba;
that on the other bank was Akkad, the old capital of Sargon I, where he established a great library.
The recent discovery of cuneiform inscriptions at Tell el-Amarna in Egypt, consisting of official despatches to Pharaoh Amenophis IV. and his predecessor from their agents in Canaan, leads some Egyptologists to conclude that in the century before the Exodus an active literary intercourse was carried on between these nations, and that the medium of the correspondence was the Assyrian language and script. 
(See Kirjath-Sepher.) However, it has not been conclusively proven which Egyptian Pharaoh the Amarna Letters reference or that the Israelite Exodus necessarily occurred after these letters.

Sepharvaim was the center of the worship of the god Adrammelech. They also worshipped the god Anammelech. After the deportation of the Israelite tribes, at least some of the residents of this city were brought to Samaria to repopulate it with other Gentile settlers.

References

External links
Jewish Virtual Library - Sepharvaim

Hebrew Bible cities
Sippar
Books of Kings
Book of Isaiah